Te Robaré may refer to:

"Te Robaré" (Prince Royce song), 2013
"Te Robaré" (Nicky Jam song), 2019